Soreng district is a district in the Indian state of Sikkim, administered from Soreng. Soreng District was officially created from West Sikkim (now Gyalshing District) in December 2021 by The Sikkim (re-Organization of District) Act, 2021, hence becoming the sixth district of Sikkim. Its shares borders with Nepal on its west, Gyalshing district to north, Namchi district to east and Darjeeling district of West Bengal to the south.

References 

Districts of Sikkim